Cheikh Taba   is a  town in Akkar Governorate, Lebanon, close to the border with Syria.

The population in Cheikh Taba are mostly Greek Orthodox and  Maronite.

History
In 1838, Eli Smith noted  the village as esh-Sheikh Taba,  whose inhabitants were Greek Orthodox Christians, located west of esh-Sheikh Mohammed.

In 1856 it was named Sheikh Taba on the map of Northern Palestine/Lebanon that Heinrich Kiepert published that year,

References

Bibliography

External links
Cheikh Taba, Localiban 

Populated places in Akkar District
Eastern Orthodox Christian communities in Lebanon
Maronite Christian communities in Lebanon